Alexeyevka is a rural locality (a selo) in Nikolayevsky Selsoviet of Zeysky District, Amur Oblast, Russia. The population was 1 as of 2018. There is 1 street.

Geography 
Alexeyevka is located 39 km southwest of Zeya (the district's administrative centre) by road. Nikolayevka is the nearest rural locality.

References 

Rural localities in Zeysky District